Alexander (Alex) Thiodolf Federley (12 July 1864, in Turku – 17 November 1932, in Helsinki) was a Swedish-Finnish graphic artist who created political cartoons, posters, book illustrations and postcards. His works are generally signed AFley.

Biography
His father was a military judge. He studied at the drawing school of the Finnish Art Society (now part of the Academy of Fine Arts, Helsinki), from 1885 to 1888, then attended the Académie Julian in Paris from 1890 to 1893, where he studied with Jules Joseph Lefebvre and Tony Robert-Fleury.

In the late 1880s, he was already providing illustrations to the Swedish-language satirical magazine  (Nib), then to the Finnish-language equivalent,  (Dear Brother), published by the Young Finnish Party. During that time, he also became one of the first political cartoonists in Finland to sign his drawings. Among his best-known book illustrations are those for the multi-volume collection of historical short-stories,  (The Surgeon's Tales), by Zachris Topelius.

In 1907, he designed the party's election poster, which was used repeatedly and as late as 1966. During the 1920s, he was the party's representative to the Haaga Township Council.

In addition to his other activities, from 1894 to 1916, he was the Chief Curator for the "Finnish Artists' Association", and he taught at a boys' preparatory vocational school from 1900 until his death, serving as the school's Director after 1909. His wife, was also an artist.

Selected works

Books by Federley
  Bildkonst, 1929 (Pictures and songs: small chips and splinters – in colors and words – from my desk; published in Finnish as  A. L., Kuvataide, [1929]
 , Söderströms, 1922 (Fairy tales about animals and birds...mostly birds.)

References

External links

More postcards by Federley @ Histdoc.net

1864 births
1932 deaths
People from Turku
People from Turku and Pori Province (Grand Duchy of Finland)
Swedish-speaking Finns
Finnish artists
Finnish cartoonists
Finnish illustrators
Postcard artists
Académie Julian alumni